The 1915 Hong Kong Sanitary Board election was held on 22 January 1915 for the two unofficial seats in the Sanitary Board of Hong Kong.

Overview
Only ratepayers who were included in the Special and Common Jury Lists of the years or ratepayers who are exempted from serving on Juries on account of their professional avocations, unofficial members of the Executive or Legislative Council, or categories of profession were entitled to vote at the election.

The election took place from 4 to 6 p.m. on 22 January in the Registry of the Supreme Court. Out of 1200 eligible voters on the jurors list and 300 exemptions, only 430 voters polled.

Three candidates ran for two seats with two long serving Board members F. B. L. Bowley and G. H. L. Fitzwilliams and also P. W. Goldring who was elected in the 1914 by-election, filling Bowley's vacant seat. Bowley was nominated by David Landale and seconded by Henry Pollock, Fitzwilliams by Henry Pollock and H. W. Looker and Goldring by E. J. Grist and H. S. Playfair.

Fitzwilliams and Goldring were elected and 806 votes out of 1,325 electorates were cast.

References

 Endacott, G. B. Government and people in Hong Kong, 1841-1962 : a constitutional history Hong Kong University Press. (1964) 
 The Hong Kong Government Gazette

Hong Kong
1915 in Hong Kong
Sanitary
January 1915 events
1915 elections in the British Empire